Sean Richard Goss (born 1 October 1995) is a professional footballer who plays as a midfielder for Scottish Premiership club Motherwell.

Goss spent his youth career at Exeter City and Manchester United. He left United in January 2017, having never made a senior appearance for the club, to join Queens Park Rangers. After making seven appearances for the club, and spending time on loan in Scotland at Rangers and St Johnstone, he joined Shrewsbury Town in August 2019. He left Shrewsbury after two seasons and returned to Scotland to join Motherwell.

Club career

Early career
Goss was born in Wegberg and grew up in Germany before moving to England at the age of eight. He joined the Exeter City youth system aged eight. In July 2012, he joined the Manchester United academy for an initial fee of £100,000, after impressing while on trial in a youth tournament in the Netherlands. In July 2015, he was included in the Manchester United first-team squad for a pre-season tour of the United States, and made an appearance against Paris Saint-Germain at Soldier Field on 29 July 2015. He was included in a match day squad for an official match for the first time on 21 November 2015, remaining on the substitutes bench as Manchester United won 2–1 against Watford at Vicarage Road in the Premier League.

Queens Park Rangers
On 28 January 2017, having never made a senior appearance for Manchester United, Goss joined Queens Park Rangers on a three-and-a-half-year contract for a fee of £500,000. He made his professional debut on 1 February 2017, coming off the substitutes bench in a Championship game against Newcastle United at St James' Park which finished 2–2.

Goss moved on loan to Scottish Premiership club Rangers in January 2018, for the rest of the season. He made his competitive debut for the club on 24 January, in a 2–0 home win against Aberdeen, in which he was one of four debutants for the club. He scored his first goal for Rangers in a 2–1 loss against Hibernian on 3 February. Manager Graeme Murty said that he wanted to sign Goss on a permanent basis, which angered QPR manager Ian Holloway.

Having played one match for QPR in the EFL Cup in September 2018, on 31 January 2019, Goss returned to Scotland's top flight to join St Johnstone on loan until the end of the 2018–19 season. He played seven games for the team from Perth, starting on 3 February when they lost 2–0 at home to leaders Celtic.

Shrewsbury Town
On 16 August 2019, Goss joined League One side Shrewsbury Town for an undisclosed fee. He made his debut for the club the following day, starting in a 0–0 draw at home to Rochdale. In his second appearance for the club, a 3–2 away win at Accrington Stanley on 20 August, Goss was awarded the man of the match award. On 12 May 2021, it was announced that he would leave Shrewsbury at the end of the season, following the expiry of his contract.

Motherwell
In August 2021, Goss signed a two-year contract with Scottish Premiership club Motherwell.

International career
Goss is of Northern Irish descent through his grandparents, and in 2018 the manager of their national team, Michael O'Neill, held talks with him regarding his international allegiance. On 7 March 2023, Goss was called up to the Northern Ireland team for the first time.

Career statistics

References

1995 births
Living people
People from Wegberg
Sportspeople from Cologne (region)
English footballers
English people of Northern Ireland descent
Manchester United F.C. players
Queens Park Rangers F.C. players
Shrewsbury Town F.C. players
Association football midfielders
English Football League players
Rangers F.C. players
St Johnstone F.C. players
Scottish Professional Football League players
Footballers from North Rhine-Westphalia